Liteni is a town in Suceava County, Bukovina, northeastern Romania. It is situated in the historical region of Western Moldavia. Liteni is the ninth-largest urban settlement in the county, with a population of 9,398 inhabitants, according to the 2011 census. It was declared a town in 2004, along with seven other localities in Suceava County. The town administers five villages, namely: Corni, Roșcani, Rotunda, Siliștea, and Vercicani.

Liteni is located in the south-eastern part of Suceava County, near the confluence of Suceava River and Siret River. The town of Dolhasca is nearby. Despite being a town, Liteni has a rural aspect in many areas of its and the main occupation of the inhabitants is agriculture.

Administration and local politics

Town council 

The town's current local council has the following political composition, according to the results of the 2020 Romanian local elections:

References

External links 

  Liteni Town Hall official site
  Suceava County site – Liteni web page

Towns in Romania
Populated places in Suceava County
Localities in Western Moldavia